Tony Hung Wing-sing (born 6 December 1983) is a Hong Kong actor and television host currently contracted to TVB. He was formerly a host for Now TV.

Biography
At the age of 10, Hung studied overseas in New Zealand at the Auckland Grammar School.  After returning to Hong Kong, Hung furthered his education at the University of Hong Kong and graduated at the age of 27. He enjoys hosting both reality and travel shows. At the 2013 TVB Anniversary Awards, he was awarded the best host together with partner Priscilla Wong for their show Pilgrimage of Wealth 2.In 2015, he won the Most Improved Male Artiste award at the TVB Anniversary Awards.

Hung also published his own book titled "Tony's secret Holiday" (Tony秘密假期).

Filmography

TV dramas

Films 
 Death Notify (2019)
 No Love Left in Tainan (2018)
 Blue Magic (2013)
 All's Well, Ends Well 2012 (2012)
 Big Blue Lake (2011)

References

External links

Tony Hung on Yahoo! Blog (Archived)

1983 births
Living people
Hong Kong male television actors
TVB actors
Hong Kong television presenters
Alumni of the University of Hong Kong
21st-century Hong Kong male actors